Zemfira is the debut album by Russian rock singer Zemfira. It was released in May 1999 on DMI Records. The album sold over 700,000 copies in Russia.

Track listing
"Почему"     (Why)
"Снег"       (Snow)
"Синоптик"   (The Weatherman)
"Ромашки"    (Daisies)
"Маечки"     (Shirts)
"СПИД"       (AIDS)
"Румба"      (Rumba)
"Скандал"    (Scandal)
"Не Пошлое"  (Unplatitudinous)
"Припевочка" (Songstergirl)*
"-140"
"Ариведерчи" (Arrivederci)
"Ракеты"     (Rockets)
"Земфира"    (Zemfira)

*Here: means girl who is very easy to get along with. The song tells about problems of young couple, it contains lyrics such as: "He is your boy | You are his girl | He is a liar | Well, and you're not a songstergirl"

Personnel 
Zemfira – Vocals, Lyrics, Music
Sergei Cozinov – Drums and Percussion
Oleg Pungin – Drums and Percussion
Vadim Solov'ev – Guitar
Yurii Tsaler – Guitar
Rinat Akhmadiev – Bass
Sergei Miroliubov – Keyboard

1999 debut albums
Zemfira albums